Neikunnam is a village in the Papanasam taluk of Thanjavur district, Tamil Nadu, India.

Demographics 

As per the 2001 census, Neikunnam had a total population of 1311 with 654 males and 667 females. The sex ratio was 1005. The literacy rate was 63.09.

References 

 

Villages in Thanjavur district